Robert M. Warner (June 28, 1927 – April 24, 2007) was an American historian who served as the Sixth Archivist of the United States at the National Archives, from July 24, 1980 to April 15, 1985.

Early life 
Born in Montrose, Colorado, he graduated from South High School in Denver, Colorado in 1945. He then earned a bachelor's degree at Muskingum College in 1949 and a Ph.D. in American history in 1958 from the University of Michigan.

Career 
He was third director of the Michigan Historical Collections before taking the federal job.

The National Archives, founded in 1934, had been part of the General Services Administration since 1949 and was controlled by political appointees. During his term, he was elected president of the Society of American Archivists, and served in that position from 1976-1977. As Archivist, Warner pushed for institutional independence for the archives. Charles McC. Mathias and Thomas F. Eagleton introduced legislation that turned the Archives into the National Archives and Records Administration (NARA) in 1985.

That year, Warner returned to the University of Michigan, eventually becoming Dean of the School of Information and Library Science. The NARA Robert M. Warner Research Center is named in his honor.

Death 
He died in Ann Arbor, Michigan of a heart attack on April 24, 2007 after battling cancer for a year.

References

External links

Secrecy and Salesmanship in the Struggle for NARA's Independence.

1927 births
2007 deaths
Muskingum University alumni
University of Michigan College of Literature, Science, and the Arts alumni
20th-century American historians
American male non-fiction writers
Presidents of the Society of American Archivists
People from Montrose, Colorado
University of Michigan faculty
Reagan administration personnel
Carter administration personnel
20th-century American male writers